Although the conservation movement developed in Europe in the 18th century, Costa Rica as a country has been heralded its champion in the current times. Costa Rica hosts an astonishing number of species, given its size, having more animal and plant species than the US and Canada combined while being only 250 miles long and 150 miles wide. A widely accepted theory for the origin of this unusual density of species is the free mixing of species from both North and South America occurring on this "inter-oceanic" and "inter-continental" landscape. Preserving the natural environment of this fragile landscape, therefore, has drawn the attention of many international scholars.

Costa Rica has made conservation a national priority, and has been at the forefront of preserving its natural environment with over a quarter of its land designated as protected in some form, which is under the administrative control of SINAC (National System of Conservation Areas)  a division of MINAE (Ministry of Environment, Energy and Telecommunications). SINAC has subdivided the country into various zones depending on the ecological diversity of that region - these zones are depicted in figure 1.

The country has used this ecological diversity to its economic advantage in the form of a thriving ecotourism industry, putting its commitment to nature, on display to visitors from across the globe. It is estimated that a record 2.6 million foreigners visited the country in 2015, almost half the population of Costa Rica itself. This tourism is facilitated by the fact that Costa Rica has a stable democracy and has a human development index of 0.776, the highest for any country in Latin America.

It is also the only country in the world that generates more than 99% of its electricity from renewable sources, relying on hydropower (78%), wind (10%), geothermal energy (10%), biomass and solar (1%). Critics have pointed out however, that in achieving this milestone, the country has built several dams (providing the bulk of its electricity) some of which have negatively impacted indigenous communities as well as the local flora and fauna.

Historical development 

"The Green Republic: A Conservation History of Costa Rica" by Sterling Evans is a renowned book that traces the development of the conservation movement in Costa Rica from the mid 1700s to present day. Evans mentions that when the Spaniards first arrived in the Americas, the landscape of Costa Rica did not appear particularly hospitable to them, compared to Guatemala or Mexico which seemed more reminiscent of the Spanish climate. Therefore, up until the 18th century, there was very little agricultural development in the region. It also lacked gold and other minerals that Christopher Columbus had hoped to find in these areas (hence the name, Rich Coast). As a result, the forest cover of Costa Rica was left more or less intact by the European settlement in the Americas.

By the mid-19th century, it was observed that the Costa Rican soil was particularly conducive to the growth of coffee. The global demand for coffee was growing rapidly, fueled by the demand from the working class in the industrializing west. The agricultural model adopted by coffee growers in Costa Rica was of small family owned farms known as cafeteras, and they strove to be responsible stewards of the land. This approach was in stark contrast to the coffee monoculture that would've developed by adopting a purely capitalistic ideology. As a result, even though the coffee production increased substantially from 1850 to 1950, there wasn't large scale deforestation in Costa Rica until the 1950s, contrary to popular belief.

Some of the key points often overlooked in Costa Rica's conservation history between 1850 and 2000 according to Evans, are as follows:

1. President Bernardo Soto's government in 1888 began the process of attracting scholars from all over the world, particularly Switzerland and Germany in an effort to educate the locals about agricultural practices harmonious with the environment such that by 1914, Costa Rica became a leading scientific research center in tropical America

2. The establishment of the University of Costa Rica (UCR) in the 1940s was a landmark event, since the university acted as a springboard for research into tropical studies in Central America. At the helm of UCR were many influential academics such as Rafael Lucas Rodríguez and Alexander Skutch whose forward thinking publications served as a foundation for the future policy decisions. Skutch noted,

"in the mid-1930s, Costa Rica was still largely unspoiled. Its population of less than a half a million people . . .was concentrated in the narrow Meseta Central. . . . Other advantages . . . to the naturalist were its political stability and the friendliness of its people. . . . Costa Rica has a record of continuous, orderly constitutional government that scarcely any other country in Latin America can match. Thus the naturalist working in some remote spot was not likely to have his studies suddenly interrupted or his thin lines of communication cut by a violent upheaval, as has happened to many in Latin America. ."

3. By 1950, Costa Rica became heavily reliant on coffee exports to Europe and the US. Around the same time, it was battling the dilemma between increasing agricultural output on one hand and protecting natural resources for future use on the other. In 1958, however, the world coffee prices plummeted, and Costa Rica's main source of income was shown to be very vulnerable to unpredictable forces. The government responded by promoting internal manufacturing and encouraging other industries. One such industry that emerged as a result, was the meat industry.

The Central American valley has been described as "perfect for cattle" by Carl Hoffman. Until 1970, the cattle raised in Costa Rica were primarily used for domestic consumption. Around 1970, the demand for beef from the US started showing an exponential growth due to the rise of the fast-food industry. This robust demand, coupled with the falling coffee prices gave the cattle industry a boost and forests started getting replaced with pastures. At its worst, Costa Rica was losing 4% of its forested area per year.

An alternative analysis by Julia Flagg within the framework of "process-tracing" reveals that after gaining independence in 1821 the isolation of Costa Rica from El Salvador, Honduras, Guatemala, and Nicaragua was critical in shaping its future and served as a divergence point in the evolution of the Central American nations. According to Mahoney  “ . . . while all of the other provinces quickly became engulfed in warfare and political chaos, Costa Rica escaped such devastation and made tentative economic strides forward”. She also argues that the lack of a land-owning elite class in Costa Rica was instrumental in the development of good governance and  maintaining a stable democracy in the country. The abolishing of the military in 1948 helped free up valuable resources that the government chose to invest into education and resource protection. The country entered into a positive reinforcement cycle thereafter, where new laws enacted drew international praise which helped solidify Costa Rica's position as global leader in resource protection .

Examples of active efforts

Environmental Services Program 
To counter reducing forest area coverage in the 1980s, the Costa Rican government pioneered a scheme in 1997 known as PES, which rewarded private land owners for keeping forests intact on their lands in lieu of the services provided by these forests to the environment and the economy as a whole. The World Bank, which provided the loan initially from 2000 to 2006 to support the payments incentivizing afforestation, viewed the program as a success overall despite some of its shortcomings.

It is estimated that the percentage of Costa Rican land covered by forests has gone up from around 20% in the 1980s to over 50% of the total area in 2013 - a growth of 250%. The program has also reduced the national carbon emissions by 11 million tons over a period of 6 years from 1999 to 2005. Indigenous communities and women in particular, have benefited due to this program. Buoyed by this success, the World Bank extended its support to the Costa Rican government's initiative by funding a new program titled "Mainstreaming Market-Based Instruments for Environmental Management". Over the years, many international agencies have pushed the national government to make the process of obtaining the payments easier so as to include more underdeveloped communities and cast a wider net for the program.

Green sea turtle conservation 

The green sea turtle is a globally endangered species and one of the most important nesting grounds for it is in Tortuguero, Costa Rica - the word Totuguero is derived from old Spanish maps meaning "place of turtles". After a steady global decline in its population due to overhunting for its meat and eggs, the Tortuguero National Park was established in 1975 in an effort to protect and save the turtle's breeding zone. A highly cited study by Tröeng and Rankin, investigated in 2004, the effects that this protective measure has had on the nesting trend. Although the population of turtles shows a large inter-annual variation thus making the task of determining the exact number very difficult, on an average, the trend has been positive over a long time scale of almost 35 years. The study illustrated that the enactment of three laws by the Costa Rican government was vital in stabilizing and increasing the population of these green sea turtles.

1. A ban on turtle and egg collection in 1963

2. A ban on the export of calipee (a part of the turtle's head that is considered a delicacy) in 1970 and finally,

3. The creation of the Tortuguero National Park in 1975 by the legislative assembly.

The lasting impact created by such forward thinking political decisions exhibits the necessity of meaningful governmental intervention.

Carbon neutral goal 

Although they contribute only 0.15% to the world's greenhouse gas emissions, the governments of New Zealand and Costa Rica have independently expressed their intents to become carbon neutral in the next decade, with Costa Rica aiming to achieve an ambitious target of becoming carbon neutral by 2021. In doing so, it would become the world's first carbon neutral country, with the expectation of influencing policy decisions in other major countries. The proposal hopes to ignite the interest of private companies to engage in practices that reduce their emissions, for example, using more fuel efficient routes in transportation, relying more on digital documents than printed ones, adopting LED lighting in offices and using more efficient air conditioning systems.

Criticisms of active efforts 
The government's approach to attain zero net emissions has yielded positive results overall, but has been described as insufficient and lacking by experts  because it neglects vehicular emissions which account for nearly 20% of the country's total emissions. The 2021 target has also been called "arbitrary" and "overambitious", since the efforts to reduce the country's reliance on imported oil  will take much longer to take effect.

In 2006, a study by Sierra and Russman analyzed the additional conservation obtained through PES, over and above the baseline conservation rate. The study concluded that the PES program definitely affected land use decisions because land owners used the payments for other productive activities thus keeping the forest cover intact. However, they also concluded that this was not the most effective use of funds because the majority of these forests would have remained intact even without the payments. The study suggested that it would a better strategy to engage in the protection of more critical habitats instead.

The jaguar is an endangered species and its habitat came under threat due to construction of the Reventazón Dam in the Reventazón valley. The Reventazón dam is the largest dam in Central America with an installed capacity of 305.5 MW. The two financiers of the project, the World Bank and the Inter-American Development Bank, financed it on the condition that the construction of the dam by the state-run Costa Rican Electricity Institute (ICE) would "restore and maintain connectivity within the Barbilla-Destierro Corridor" which is critical to the survival of the jaguar.

Protestors of this project claim that the construction has failed to meet the expectations on the following issues:

1) The constructors did not completely clear vegetation from the areas that would be flooded due to this project. As a result, the uncleared vegetation in the flooded areas began to stagnate, creating the perfect conditions for the growth of the Water Hyacinth (an invasive species). The Water Hyacinth acted as a source for a large amount of carbon dioxide and methane emitted into the atmosphere.

2) Reforestation around the reservoir lake to assist in the migration of the jaguars has not been completed making their movement more difficult.

3) Due to the removal of a lot of material to facilitate construction, the neighboring Lancaster wetlands (home to more than 250 species of birds and 80 species of mammals, reptiles and amphibians) have been left in a state more susceptible to landslides.

What appears to be common in these criticisms is that the initiatives have moved things in the right direction overall, but the implementation hasn't been as good as promised.

References 

 
Environment of Costa Rica